The Chief Minister of the Mandalay Region is the Head of the Mandalay Region Government, which is a sub-cabinet of the Government of Myanmar and the regional government of Mandalay Region The current Chief Minister is Maung Ko appointed by Min Aung Hlaing.

Executive Authority 
The executive power of the Region or State Government by the Region or State Legislative Affairs extends to all areas that are not covered with the provisions of the Constitution. Moreover, federal law allows the Region or State Government extend into matters.

Government Office 
Region or State Administration Department position as chief secretary of the relevant Region or State Government. In addition, the Region or State Department of General Administration is also the office of the relevant Region or State Mission.

The government office of the Mandalay Region is situated in Aungmyethazan Township, corner of 24th and 64th street.

List of Chief Minister  (2011–present)

See also 
 Mandalay Region Government
 Mandalay Region Hluttaw
 Chief Minister of Myanmar

References 

http://www.president-office.gov.mm/?q=cabinet/region-and-state-government/id-10184

Mandalay Region
State and region governments of Myanmar